Utkalevo (Ütkäl) is a rural locality (a selo) in Shigayevsky Selsoviet, Beloretsky District, Bashkortostan, Russia. The population was 396 as of 2010. There are 10 streets.

Geography 
Utkalevo is located 29 km southwest of Beloretsk (the district's administrative centre) by road. Rysakayevo is the nearest rural locality.

References 

Rural localities in Beloretsky District